The 2001 CONCACAF U-17 Tournament was played in Honduras and United States.

2001 CONCACAF U-17 Tournament qualification 
The qualification for the 2001 CONCACAF U-17 Tournament took place between November 2000 and February 2001.

teams

Honduras were automatically qualified as hosts. Canada, Mexico and the United States did not have to enter qualifying either. The rest advanced from qualifying.

Caribbean Zone

First round

Group A

Group B

 advanced

Group C

Group D

Group E

Second round

Group 1

Group 2

Central American Zone

Group stage

Group A
United States qualified to the 2001 FIFA U-17 World Championship in Trinidad and Tobago.

Group B
Costa Rica qualified to the 2001 FIFA U-17 World Championship in Trinidad and Tobago.

References

2001
U-17
2001
2001
2000–01 in Honduran football
2000–01 in Mexican football
2000–01 in Costa Rican football
2001 in Haitian sport
2000–01 in Salvadoran football
2001 in Canadian soccer
2001 in American soccer
2000–01 in Jamaican football
2001 in youth association football